Ernest Smith (born 1908, death date unknown) was an American Negro league baseball left fielder. He played from 1937 to 1942 with the Chicago American Giants, Kansas City Monarchs, and Homestead Grays.

References

External links
 and Seamheads

Chicago American Giants players
Kansas City Monarchs players
Homestead Grays players
1908 births
Year of death unknown
Baseball outfielders